In optics, an image is defined as the collection of focus points of light rays coming from an object. A real image is the collection of focus points made by converging rays, while a virtual image is the collection of focus points made by extensions of diverging rays. In other words, a virtual image is found by tracing real rays that emerge from an optical device (lens, mirror, or some combination) backward to perceived or apparent origins of ray divergences. In diagrams of optical systems, virtual rays are conventionally represented by dotted lines, to contrast with the solid lines of real rays.

Because the rays never really converge, a virtual image cannot be projected onto a screen. In contrast, a real image can be projected on the screen as it is formed by rays that converge on a real location. A real image can be projected onto a diffusely reflecting screen so people can see the image (the image on the screen plays as an object to be imaged by human eyes).

 A plane mirror forms a virtual image positioned behind the mirror. Although the rays of light seem to come from behind the mirror, light from the source only exists in front of the mirror. The image in a plane mirror is not magnified (that is, the image is the same size as the object) and appears to be as far behind the mirror as the object is in front of the mirror.
 A diverging lens (one that is thicker at the edges than the middle) or a convex mirror forms a virtual image. Such an image is reduced in size when compared to the original object. A converging lens (one that is thicker in the middle than at the edges) or a concave mirror is also capable of producing a virtual image if the object is within the focal length. Such an image will be magnified. In contrast, an object placed in front of a converging lens or concave mirror at a position beyond the focal length produces a real image. Such an image will be magnified if the position of the object is within twice the focal length, or else the image will be reduced if the object is further than twice the focal length. It can be obtained on screen
....

See also 

 Focal plane
 Image plane
 Lens
 Real image

References

Geometrical optics